Kumbadjena occidentalis is a species of velvet worm in the family Peripatopsidae described by Joseph James Fletcher in 1895. This species has 15 pairs of legs. The type locality is in Western Australia.

References

Onychophorans of Australasia
Onychophoran species
Animals described in 1895
Taxa named by Joseph James Fletcher